The Priory of Santa Maria del Vilar at Villelongue-dels-Monts in the department of the Pyrénées-Orientales, France, houses the Romanian Orthodox Monastery of the Dormition of the Mother of God. It falls under the jurisdiction of the Romanian Orthodox Metropolitan of Western and Southern Europe.

History 
Its former hegumen was Father Timotei Lauran, now bishop of Spain and Portugal under the jurisdiction of the Romanian Orthodox Metropolitan of Western and Southern Europe.

External links
Santa Maria del Vilar - photos

Romanian Orthodox monasteries outside Romania
Eastern Orthodox monasteries in France